Ghorwane is a Mozambican marrabenta musical band who have primarily use guitars saxophones and percussion instrument. It was founded in 1983. The band derived its name from the lake of the same name in the province of Gaza. This name was given by President Samora Machel during a festival to celebrate the ten years of independence in 1985. Samora has declared that "It's prohibited to lie in the People's Republic of Mozambique" and cites Ghorwane as an example. Ghorwane is the Shangaan term for "Good Boys". Their style is a combination of traditional Mozambique music, Afropop, and fusion. Ghorwane's music is sung in local languages, including Shangaan, Ronga and Chope. The band's composer and saxophonist, Jose "Zeca" Alage, was murdered in 1993. Their 2005 album VANA VA NDOTA was dedicated to Zeca Alage (1959–1993) and  Pedro Langa (1959–2001).

Later that same year, Ghorwane started a music co-operative, the first of its kind in Mozambique, with the intention of promoting Mozambican music, improving working conditions for local musicians and protecting composers rights.

Discography 
(May not be complete)
Majurugenta (1993)
 Muthimba
 Majurugenta
 Matarlatanta
 Xai-Xai
 Mavabwyi
 Sathuma
 Buluku
 Terehumba
 Akuhanha

Não é preciso empurrar (Soundtrack) (1994)
Kudumba (1997)
 	
 U Yo Mussiya Kwini
 Txongola
 Salabude
 Vhory
 Massotcha
 Pim-Pam-Pum
 Xizambiza
 Progresso
 Sathani
 Mamba Ya Malepfu

Mozambique Relief (a compilation, fundraising album (2000)

 Mayvavo - Ghorwane
 Matxutxubanga
 Wavitika - Ghorwane
 Golheani - José Mucavele
 Tiyisselane - Zebra
 Xitarato
 Lanixlamalissa - José Mucavele
 Kadivae Mono - Stewart Sukuma
 Danca Marrabenta - Gito Baloi
 As Tuas Trancas - José Mucavele
 Mayvavo LL - Ghorwane

VANA VA NDOTA (2005)

 Beijinhos
 Vana-Va-Ndota
 Nudez
 Xindzavane
 Kadinfuna
 Tlhanga
 Ubiwilitolo
 Tlhary
 Ndzava
 Guidema
 Livengo
 Xitchukete
 Tlhivhi

References and external links
 Ghorwane was featured in episode 5 of the BBC production The African Rock 'n' Roll Years
 Ghorwane in Real World Records website

Mozambican music
Real World Records artists
Musical groups established in 1983